The 2007 NFL season was the 88th regular season of the National Football League (NFL).

Regular-season play was held from September 6 to December 30. The campaign kicked off with the defending Super Bowl XLI champion Indianapolis Colts defeating the New Orleans Saints in the NFL Kickoff Game.

The New England Patriots became the first team to complete the regular season undefeated since the league expanded to a 16-game regular season in 1978. Four weeks after the playoffs began on January 5, 2008, the Patriots' bid for a perfect season was dashed when they lost to the New York Giants in Super Bowl XLII, the league championship game at University of Phoenix Stadium in Glendale, Arizona on February 3.

Draft
The 2007 NFL Draft was held from April 28 to 29, 2007 at New York City’s Radio City Music Hall. With the first pick, the Oakland Raiders selected quarterback JaMarcus Russell from Louisiana State University.

New referee
John Parry was promoted to referee, replacing Bill Vinovich, who was forced to resign due to a heart condition. Vinovich would then serve as a replay official from 2007 to 2011. He would later be given a clean bill of health and return to the field as a referee in 2012.

Rule changes
The following rule changes were passed at the league's annual owners meeting in Phoenix, Arizona during the week of March 25–28:

 The instant replay system, used since the 1999 season, was finally made a permanent officiating tool. Previously, it was renewed on a biennial basis.
 The system has also been upgraded to use high-definition technology. However, the systems at Texas Stadium (Dallas Cowboys), RCA Dome (Indianapolis Colts), and Giants Stadium (New York Giants and Jets) did not receive the HDTV updates since those stadiums were scheduled to be (and since have been) replaced in the forthcoming years. One reason that the technology was improved was that fans with high-definition televisions at home were having better views on replays than the officials and according to Dean Blandino, the NFL's instant replay director "that could have bit us in the rear if we continued [with the old system]." In addition, the amount of time allotted for the referee to review a play was reduced from 90 seconds to one minute.
 After a play is over, players who spike the ball in the field of play, other than in the end zone, will receive a 5-yard delay of game penalty.
 Forward passes that unintentionally hit an offensive lineman before an eligible receiver will no longer be an illegal touching penalty, but deliberate actions are still penalized.
 Roughing-the-passer penalties will not be called on a defender engaged with a quarterback who simply extends his arms and shoves the passer to the ground.
 During situations where crowd noise becomes a problem (when it becomes too loud that it prevents the offensive team from hearing its signals), the offense can no longer ask the referee to reset the play clock.
 It is necessary to have the ball touch the pylon or break the plane above the pylon to count as a touchdown. Previously, a player just had to have some portion of his body over the goal line or pylon to count a touchdown.
 A completed catch is now when a receiver gets two feet down and has control of the ball. Previously, a receiver had to make "a football move" in addition to having control of the ball for a reception.
 Players will be subject to a fine from the league for playing with an unbuckled chin strap. Officials will not penalize for chin strap violations during a game.

Preseason
The Hall of Fame Game was played in Canton, Ohio on Sunday August 5, 2007, with the Pittsburgh Steelers defeating the Saints by a score of 20–7; the game was televised by the NFL Network, replacing NBC, who had been previously scheduled to broadcast the China Bowl exhibition game from Beijing, China on August 8, 2007 between the New England Patriots and the Seattle Seahawks at Workers Stadium. However, with all efforts being put into the London regular season game, plans for the game were postponed (then later cancelled completely) as Beijing hosted the 2008 Summer Olympics.

Regular season

Schedule formula
Based on the NFL's scheduling formula, the intraconference and interconference matchups for 2007 were:

Intraconference
 AFC East vs. AFC North
 AFC West vs. AFC South
 NFC East vs. NFC North
 NFC West vs. NFC South

Interconference
 AFC East vs. NFC East
 AFC North vs. NFC West
 AFC South vs. NFC South
 AFC West vs. NFC North

Opening weekend
On March 26, 2007, the league announced the opening Saints-Colts Kickoff Game on September 6 that would be telecast on NBC. Pre-game activities featured Indiana native John Mellencamp, Billy Joel, and Kelly Clarkson. The entertainment portion of events started 30 minutes earlier than the scheduled start time of the game, leading up to the unveiling of the Colts’ Super Bowl XLI championship banner. The opening events were simulcast on NFL Network.

The Dallas Cowboys hosted the New York Giants in the first Sunday night game September 9 at 8:15 p.m. US EDT. Monday Night Football on ESPN kicked off with a doubleheader on September 10 with the Cincinnati Bengals hosting the Baltimore Ravens at 7:00 p.m. US EDT, and the San Francisco 49ers hosting the Arizona Cardinals at 10:15 p.m. US EDT. The 49ers paid tribute to three-time Super Bowl winning head coach Bill Walsh, who died July 30, in that game.

Going global
In October 2006, NFL club owners approved a plan to stage up to two international regular season games per season beginning in 2007 and continuing through at least 2011. On February 2, 2007, the league announced that the Week 8 contest between the New York Giants and the Miami Dolphins would be played at Wembley Stadium in London on October 28 at 5 p.m. GMT, which was 1 p.m. EDT) As the Giants were the away-team designate from the NFC, Fox broadcast the game in the USA according to league broadcast contract rules.

"Super Bowl 41"
In Week 9, the New England Patriots (8–0) faced the Indianapolis Colts (7–0) in a battle of undefeated teams.  Thus there was a lot of hype surrounding the game, also due to the fact that these teams had met in the previous season's AFC Championship game, and would possibly meet later in the 2007 AFC Championship game.  Many people dubbed the game "Super Bowl 41".  The Patriots prevailed 24–20, and would finish the regular season as the league's first 16–0 team.

Thanksgiving
For the second year in a row, three games were held on the United States' Thanksgiving Day (November 22). In addition to the traditional games hosted by the Detroit Lions and Cowboys (with those teams respectively playing the Green Bay Packers and the New York Jets, with the Packers–Lions game starting at 12:30 p.m. US EST and the Jets–Cowboys game kicking off at 4:15 p.m. US EST respectively), the Colts faced the Atlanta Falcons in the Georgia Dome, with kickoff at 8:15 p.m. US EST.

Flex scheduling
The NFL entered its second year of flexible scheduling in the final weeks of the season. In each of the Sunday night contests from Weeks 11 through 17, NBC had the option of switching its Sunday night game for a more favorable contest, up to 12 days before the game's start.

In addition to an extra week of flexible scheduling (because of the conflict with scheduling Christmas Eve the previous season, which NBC did not do (instead opting to air a game on Christmas Day), the NFL slightly changed its flex-schedule procedure. In 2006, the league did not reveal its predetermined Sunday night game; the reason given by the league was to avoid embarrassing the teams switched out for a more compelling game.
In 2007, the league announced all predetermined matchups, with a footnote on the games subject to flex scheduling. Also, the network that carries the "doubleheader" week game (either CBS or Fox) will be able to switch one game per week into the 4:15 PM (US
ET) time slot, except in the final week, when NBC will select one game for the 8:15 PM slot, and both CBS and Fox will have doubleheader games on December 30.

Week 11:
 The New England–Buffalo game, originally scheduled for 1:00 p.m. ET on CBS, was flexed into NBC Sunday Night Football at 8:15 p.m. ET, replacing the Chicago–Seattle game, which was moved to 4:15 p.m. ET on Fox.
 The New York Giants–Detroit game, originally scheduled for 4:15 p.m. ET, was flexed to 1:00 p.m. ET on Fox.
 The Pittsburgh–New York Jets game, originally scheduled for 1:00 p.m. ET, was flexed to 4:05 p.m. ET on CBS.
 The Washington–Dallas game, originally scheduled for 1:00 p.m. ET, was flexed to 4:15 p.m. ET on Fox.

Week 12: The Denver–Chicago game, originally scheduled for 1:00 p.m. ET, was flexed to 4:15 p.m. ET on CBS.

Week 13: The Tampa Bay–New Orleans game, originally scheduled for 1:00 p.m. ET, was flexed to 4:15 p.m. ET on Fox.

Week 14: The Pittsburgh–New England game, originally scheduled for 1:00 p.m. ET, was flexed to 4:15 p.m. ET on CBS.

Week 16:
 The Washington–Minnesota game, originally scheduled for 1:00 p.m. ET on Fox, was flexed into NBC Sunday Night Football at 8:15 p.m. ET, replacing the Tampa Bay–San Francisco game, which was moved to 4:05 p.m. ET on Fox.
 The Miami–New England game, originally scheduled for 1:00 p.m. ET, was flexed to 4:15 p.m. ET on CBS.

Week 17:
 The Tennessee–Indianapolis game, originally scheduled for 1:00 p.m. ET on CBS, was flexed into NBC Sunday Night Football at 8:15 p.m. ET, replacing the Kansas City–New York Jets game, which was moved to 4:15 p.m. ET on CBS.
 The Pittsburgh–Baltimore game, originally scheduled for 1:00 p.m. ET, was flexed to 4:15 p.m. ET on CBS.
 The Dallas–Washington game, originally scheduled for 1:00 p.m. ET, was flexed to 4:15 p.m. ET on Fox.

Regular season standings

Tiebreakers
 Pittsburgh finished in first place in the AFC North over Cleveland based on a head-to-head sweep.
 Detroit finished in third place in the NFC North over Chicago based on a head-to-head sweep.
 Carolina finished in second place in the NFC South over New Orleans based on a better conference record (7–5 to New Orleans’ 6–6).
 Kansas City finished in third place in the AFC West over Oakland based on a better record against common opponents. (2–10 to Oakland's 1–11).
 Tennessee clinched the AFC No. 6 seed over Cleveland based on a better record against common opponents. (4–1 to Cleveland's 3–2).
 Dallas clinched the NFC No. 1 seed over Green Bay based on a head-to-head victory.

Playoffs

Bracket

Events

Player conduct off the field

The NFLPA, then led by their president Gene Upshaw and NFL commissioner Roger Goodell, worked with player conduct in the form of suspensions for off the field conduct in light of the more than fifty arrests by local law enforcement since the start of the 2006 season. The hardest hit came on April 10 when Adam "Pacman" Jones of the Tennessee Titans was suspended for the entire season for his five arrests, the most blatant while in Las Vegas for the NBA All-Star Weekend in February where he was accused of causing a riot/shooting in a strip club. That same day, Chris Henry of the Cincinnati Bengals was suspended for the first eight games of the season for his run-ins with the legal system. The other big name that has been caught in the web of controversy was Falcons' quarterback Michael Vick. Vick was charged on July 24, 2007 with dogfighting and animal abuse, and was suspended following a guilty plea in the case, on which he was sentenced to 23 months in prison (retroactive to November) and three years probation on December 10.

Death of Marquise Hill
On the evening of May 27, 2007, Marquise Hill, a defensive end for the New England Patriots and a friend fell off a jet ski in Lake Pontchartrain, north of New Orleans. The two were wearing neither personal flotation nor tracking devices. The friend was rescued and sent to Tulane Medical Center, but Hill did not survive; his body was found the next day.  The Patriots honored Hill, the first Patriots player to die while still a member of the team, by wearing black circular decals on their helmets with Hill's number, 91.

Murder of Sean Taylor
Fourth-year player Sean Taylor, a free safety for the Redskins, was shot in his home near Miami, Florida on November 26. Armed with a machete, Taylor confronted robbers who were breaking into his home—then 17-year-old Eric Rivera, Jr., 18-year-old Charles Wadlow, and 20-year-olds Jason Mitchell and Venjah Hunte. Rivera fired two shots from his 9 mm gun, one missing and the other hitting Taylor's leg, going from his right groin to his left according to an autopsy obtained by Associated Press. He died from his injuries the next day.

For the remainder of the season, the Redskins honored him with a black patch on their right shoulder of the player uniform jerseys, while all 32 teams honored Taylor by applying a decal with his playing number (21) on the left back side of their helmets. Taylor was honored in all games during Week 13 and all three Redskins representatives in the Pro Bowl wore number 21 in his honor. In 2013, a jury found Rivera guilty of second-degree murder and armed burglary. In 2014 Rivera received a sentence of 57 years in prison; he testified someone else fired the gun. Jason Scott Mitchell was also convicted and sentenced to life imprisonment, Venjah Hunte was sentenced to 29 years in prison, Charles Wardlow to 30 years in prison, and Timmy Lee Brown to 18 years in prison.

Spygate

During the Patriots season opening game at The Meadowlands against the Jets, a Patriots camera staffer was ejected from the Patriots sideline and was accused of videotaping the Jets' defensive coaches relaying signals. The end result was that the team was fined $250,000, head coach Bill Belichick was docked $500,000 (the maximum fine that could be imposed) and also stripped of their first round selection of the 2008 NFL Draft. If the Pats had failed to make the playoffs, the penalty would have been their second and third round picks. The team was allowed to keep their other first-round pick acquired from the San Francisco 49ers during the previous year's selection meeting.

Other events
 The NFL set an all-time attendance record in 2007, with the league's 32 stadiums attracting 17,345,205 paying customers during the regular season. Average per-game attendance was 67,755.
 The ESPN Monday Night Football game between the unbeaten New England Patriots and the Baltimore Ravens on December 3 drew the highest basic cable rating in history, with over 17.5 million viewers, beating the premiere of Disney Channel’s High School Musical 2, which set the previous record on August 17. The previous high-water mark was a MNF telecast between the New York Giants and Dallas Cowboys on October 23, 2006, which drew over 16 million viewers.

Milestones
The following teams and players set all-time NFL records during the regular season:

 Hobbs' kickoff return was also, at the time, tied for the longest play in NFL history until Antonio Cromartie broke the record.

Regular season statistical leaders

Awards

All-Pro Team

Team superlatives

Offense
Most points scored: New England, 589
Fewest points scored: San Francisco, 219
Most total offensive yards: New England, 6,580
Fewest total offensive yards: San Francisco, 3,797
Most total passing yards: New England, 4,731
Fewest total passing yards: San Francisco, 2,320
Most rushing yards: Minnesota, 2,634
Fewest rushing yards: Kansas City, 1,248

Defense
Fewest points allowed: Indianapolis, 262
Most points allowed: Detroit, 444
Fewest total yards allowed: Pittsburgh, 4,262
Most total yards allowed: Detroit, 6,042
Fewest passing yards allowed: Tampa Bay, 2,725
Most passing yards allowed: Minnesota, 4,225
Fewest rushing yards allowed: Minnesota, 1,185
Most rushing yards allowed: Miami, 2,456

Coaching changes
The following teams hired new head coaches prior to the start of the 2007 season:

The following head coaches were fired or resigned during the 2007 season:

Stadiums
The 2007 season was the last in the RCA Dome for the Indianapolis Colts, who had played there since 1984. The franchise moved to the new Lucas Oil Stadium in time for the 2008 season, located directly across the street. The dome would be demolished, and an extension to the Indiana Convention Center would replace the stadium.

Alltel Stadium reverts to Jacksonville Municipal Stadium after Alltel declines to renew the naming rights of the Jacksonville Jaguars's home.

Uniforms and patches
 This was the final season in which the classic NFL Shield logo, which had not changed since 1980, was used. An updated version first seen on August 31 in USA Today was put into use starting with the 2008 NFL Draft in April. The new logo design features eight stars (one for each division) instead of the current 25 stars, the football now resembles that on the top of the Vince Lombardi Trophy, given to the Super Bowl champion and the lettering and point has been updated and modified to that of the league's current typeface for other logos.
 Teams that have permanent captains are allowed to wear a "C" patch (similar to those in ice hockey) on their right shoulder. The patch is in team colors with four stars under the "C." A gold star is placed on a bar below the "C" signaling how many years (with a maximum of four years) that player has been captain. The Pittsburgh Steelers—who were using up two patches as it was for the season with their own logo (which was already part of the standard uniforms) and the team's 75th anniversary logo—and Oakland Raiders elected not to use the "C" patch.
 The San Diego Chargers introduced new uniforms featuring white helmets, navy face masks, and revamped gold lightning bolts. A powder blue third jersey was also introduced.
 San Francisco 49ers coach Mike Nolan and Jaguars coach Jack Del Rio each wore suits on the sidelines for all of the teams' home games to honor Nolan's father, former 49ers and Saints coach Dick Nolan. In 2006, both coaches were allowed to wear a suit on the sidelines for a maximum of two home games. Del Rio did not wear a suit in the September 16 game against the Falcons due to the extreme heat in Jacksonville that day. Nolan wore a suit at the Meadowlands against the Giants on October 21.
 The Washington Redskins celebrated their 75th anniversary season (the franchise having been founded in 1932 as the Boston Braves), and wore Vince Lombardi-styled uniforms against the New York Giants on September 23. The Philadelphia Eagles and their cross-state rival Pittsburgh Steelers also celebrated their respective 75th seasons, having been founded in 1933. The Eagles wore replicas of their inaugural season uniforms against the Detroit Lions on September 23, while the Steelers wore 1960 uniforms against the Buffalo Bills on September 16 and did so again when the Baltimore Ravens visited on November 5.
 Throwback uniforms were not just limited to team anniversary celebrations. The Cleveland Browns wore their 1957 throwbacks in a game against the Houston Texans on November 25, the Minnesota Vikings wore 1970s uniforms against the Green Bay Packers on September 30 (in the same game that Brett Favre passed Dan Marino for most touchdown passes in NFL history), while the Jets honored their historic predecessors on October 14 against the Eagles and, in a rare instance, wore them in a road game at Miami December 2 by wearing the New York Titans' 1960 through 1962 uniforms. The team did not become the Jets until 1963. The Cowboys wore their 1960 uniforms on November 29 against the Packers, and the Bills wore their 1960s throwbacks at home against Dallas October 7 and against Miami December 9.
 The 49ers also honored the late Bill Walsh, coach of their wins in Super Bowls XVI, XIX, and XXIII by wearing throwback uniforms from the 1980s in their opener on September 10 against the Arizona Cardinals. Mike Nolan had been considering wearing the 1980s uniforms for the entire season to honor Walsh's memory. The retro uniforms were worn again on November 18 against the Seahawks. In addition, all season long, the team wore a black football-shaped decal on their helmets with the initials "BW" in white.
 The Kansas City Chiefs honored their late former owner and team founder Lamar Hunt by wearing special American Football League logo patches on their jerseys with the letters "LH" emblazoned inside the logo's football. Originally meant to be a one-season tribute, the Chiefs announced that as of the 2008 NFL season, the patch will be a permanent fixture on the jerseys, joining the Chicago Bears (for George Halas) and Cleveland Browns (for Al Lerner) for such memorial patches.

Television

The 2007 season marked the second year under the league's television contracts with its American broadcast partners. CBS and Fox primarily televised Sunday afternoon AFC and NFC away games, respectively. NBC broadcast Sunday Night Football, ESPN aired Monday Night Football, and NFL Network held the rights to Thursday Night Football.

The pre-game shows made some changes, with former Steelers coach Bill Cowher joining host James Brown, Boomer Esiason, Shannon Sharpe and Dan Marino on CBS’ The NFL Today. On Fox, after one season on the road, Fox NFL Sunday returned to Los Angeles as Curt Menefee took over as full-time host. Chris Rose, who had been doing in-game updates of other NFL games, was reverted to a part-time play-by-play role.

The biggest changes were at NBC and ESPN. Michael Irvin’s contract with ESPN was not renewed, and former coach Bill Parcells returned to the network after four years as Cowboys head coach. Parcells left before the season ended to become the Miami Dolphins VP of Player Personnel. Another pair of former Cowboys, Emmitt Smith and Keyshawn Johnson also provided roles in the studio for Sunday NFL Countdown and Monday Night Countdown. At Monday Night Football, Joe Theismann was dropped (and would later resign from the network) after seventeen years in the booth between the Sunday and Monday Night packages, and former Philadelphia Eagles quarterback and current Philadelphia Soul (AFL) president Ron Jaworski took his place alongside Mike Tirico and Tony Kornheiser. Part of the reason that Jaworski replaced Theismann was because of his chemistry with Kornheiser on Pardon the Interruption, where Jaworski was a frequent guest during the football season.

NBC’s Football Night in America also made two changes. MSNBC Countdown anchor Keith Olbermann joined Bob Costas and Cris Collinsworth as another co-host, while Sterling Sharpe exited as a studio analyst, and former New York Giants running back Tiki Barber replaced him. In another change, Faith Hill took over singing “Waiting All Day For Sunday Night” for Pink.

In the second year of the NFL Network's “Run to the Playoffs”, Marshall Faulk and Deion Sanders replaced Dick Vermeil for two games when Collinsworth was unavailable. An unforced change saw Bryant Gumbel miss the Broncos–Texans game December 13 due to a sore throat and NBC announcer Tom Hammond step into Gumbel's play-by-play role in what turned out to be more or less a preview of one of NBC's Wild Card Game announcing teams.

Controversy surrounding NFL Network coverage

The dispute between the NFL Network and various cable companies involving the distribution of the cable channel continued throughout the season, getting the attention of government officials when the NFL Network was scheduled to televise two high-profile regular season games: the Packers-Cowboys game on November 29 and the Patriots-Giants game on December 29. In the case of the Packers-Cowboys game, the carriage was so limited that even Governor of Wisconsin Jim Doyle went to his brother's house to watch the game on satellite (which is where the majority of the viewers watch the network). The contest drew a network record 10.1 million viewers, a high-water mark at that time.

Some politicians urged the league to seek a resolution to conflict. In December, Massachusetts Senator John Kerry wrote a letter to NFL Commissioner Roger Goodell asking for the league to settle their differences in time for the Patriots-Giants game. Because the game, as it turned out, would be the Patriots' attempt to seal the record that would make them the first undefeated team in 35 years, Kerry urged for a solution to be decided upon in time so that Americans can witness "an historic event." Also, Pennsylvania Senator Arlen Specter threatened to introduce legislation to eliminate the league's freedom from antitrust laws.

On December 26, the NFL announced that, despite initial plans to broadcast the game only on the NFL Network, the game would be presented in a three-network simulcast with both CBS and NBC, the first time an NFL game would be broadcast on three networks, and the first simulcast of any pro football game since Super Bowl I. Nielsen ratings saw CBS with 15.7 million viewers, NBC with 13.2 million viewers and NFL Network with 4.5 million viewers for the game. In addition, local stations in New York City (WWOR-TV in nearby Secaucus, New Jersey), Boston (WCVB-TV), and Manchester, New Hampshire (WMUR-TV), all previously signed on to carry the game in the teams' home markets, added 1.2 million viewers, making it the most watched TV show since the 2007 Oscars and the most watched regular season NFL telecast in twelve years.

Notes

References

External links
Football Outsiders 2007 DVOA Ratings

National Football League seasons
 
National Football League